Paul Staight (born 8 December 1974) is an Australian badminton player. He competed in the men's doubles tournament at the 1996 Summer Olympics.

References

1974 births
Living people
Australian male badminton players
Olympic badminton players of Australia
Badminton players at the 1996 Summer Olympics
Sportspeople from Melbourne
Sportswomen from Victoria (Australia)
People from Werribee, Victoria